The Hotel Bohema  is a five-star hotel located at 9 Konarskiego Street, in downtown Bydgoszcz, Poland. The building is registered on the Kuyavian-Pomeranian Voivodeship Heritage List.

Location
The building stands on the western side of Konarskiego Street in Bydgoszcz, near Piotra Skargi Street. The building is in the vicinity of the Park Casimir the Great, Plac Wolnosci and Foutain "Potop".

History
The building was constructed in 1877 by master mason Anton Hoffmann, stepfather of Józef Święcicki, who is known for designing many townhouses in Bydgoszcz, in particular Hotel "Pod Orlem" and the buildings at 63 Gdanska street or at 1/3 Stary Port Street.

The first owner was a brick factory manager, Otto Bollmann, a German merchant who never lived in the house. 
The edifice was conceived as a tenement house with five apartments. Originally at Schule straße 3, tenants were senior officers, officials and artists, such as:
 Julius Bachmann, Lord Mayor of Bromberg in the 1880s,;
 Jerzy Rupniewski, famous 1920s-1950s Polish painter.

In 1920, the property passed into the hands of Magdalena Łaganowska who settled there and rented the other flats. During World War II, the tenement was taken over by German authorities, who accommodated there doctors who worked at the field hospital set up at 5 Konarskiego, now the building of the Catering School of Bydgoszcz.

After World War II, the tenement was managed by a communist estate agency, till the early 1990s. In 1997, it returned to private hands.  Since December 2003, the new owners of the building rebuilt the interiors and opened in July 2008 the Hotel "Bohema". The Café and restaurant "Weranda" opened on April 15, 2007, and restaurant "Black Diamond" on March 22, 2009.

Architecture and characteristics
The hotel features eclectic style, standing out as a charm and rich bourgeois house from the belle époque period.

The facade on the street displays neo-Renaissance characteristics, in particular:
 a frieze and a rosette strip parting ground and first floor;
 two slight avant-corps, the right one -giving way to a passage to the backyard- is adorned on the first level by a figure inserted in the curved pediment;
 pilasters on the first floor entirely covered with motifs.

The building side giving onto the park comprises the "Weranda" restaurant, but also exposes in the background restored wooden balcony and loggia.

The hotel offers 24 rooms, a studio for families, apartments and suites. 

Hotel "Bohema", since 2008, is the only five star hotel within Kuyavian-Pomeranian Voivodeship.

The building has been registered on the Kuyavian-Pomeranian Voivodeship Heritage List on September 16, 2008.

Gallery

See also

 List of hotels in Poland
 Bydgoszcz
 Piotra Skargi Street in Bydgoszcz
 Gdańska Street, Bydgoszcz
 Freedom Square, Bydgoszcz
 Jagiellońska street in Bydgoszcz
 Casimir the Great Park

References

External links
  Web site of Hotel Bohema

Bibliography
  
  
 From Bunia to "Bohema", discussion between Joanna and Janusz Franczak with Irena Stürm-Delcroix, leaflet booklet published by the hotel.

Cultural heritage monuments in Bydgoszcz
Buildings and structures in Bydgoszcz
Hotels in Bydgoszcz
Hotels in Poland
Hotels established in 2008